Řečice is a municipality and village in Pelhřimov District in the Vysočina Region of the Czech Republic. It has about 200 inhabitants.

Administrative parts
Villages of Bystrá, Křepiny and Záběhlice are administrative parts of Řečice.

References

Villages in Pelhřimov District